Medical Hypothesis, Discovery & Innovation in Ophthalmology  is a quarterly peer-reviewed open access medical journal covering ophthalmology. It was established in 2012 by Fatemeh Heidary. The journal is published by the International Virtual Ophthalmic Research Center, a nonprofit corporation registered in Texas, United States.  The journal was published from 2012 to 2015 by MEPTIC (owned by R. GHAREBAGHI), which has been transferred to a new organization, International Virtual Ophthalmic Research Center (IVORC) since January 2015.

Abstracting and indexing 
The journal is abstracted and indexed in Scopus, Chemical Abstracts Service, Publons, and PubMed Central. The Dimensions website indicates that each paper at this journal has around 5 citations, on average.

The journal follows the ethical principles of the World Association of Medical Editors and the International Committee of Medical Journal Editors.

See also 
Medical Hypotheses

References

External links 

Ophthalmology journals
Publications established in 2012
Quarterly journals
English-language journals